Neuropathic arthropathy (or neuropathic osteoarthropathy), also known as Charcot joint (often Charcot foot) after the first to describe it, Jean-Martin Charcot, refers to progressive degeneration of a weight-bearing joint, a process marked by bony destruction, bone resorption, and eventual deformity due to loss of sensation. Onset is usually insidious.

If this pathological process continues unchecked, it can result in joint deformity, ulceration and/or superinfection, loss of function, and in the worst-case scenario, amputation or death. Early identification of joint changes is the best way to limit morbidity.

Symptoms and signs

The clinical presentation varies depending on the stage of the disease from mild swelling to severe swelling and moderate deformity. Inflammation, erythema, pain and increased skin temperature (3–7 degrees Celsius) around the joint may be noticeable on examination. X-rays may reveal bone resorption and degenerative changes in the joint. These findings in the presence of intact skin and loss of protective sensation are pathognomonic of acute Charcot arthropathy.

Roughly 75% of patients experience pain, but it is less than what would be expected based on the severity of the clinical and radiographic findings.

Pathogenesis
Any condition resulting in decreased peripheral sensation, proprioception, and fine motor control:
Diabetes mellitus neuropathy (the most common in the U.S. today, resulting in destruction of foot and ankle joints), with Charcot joints in 1/600-700 diabetics; related to long-term high blood glucose levels. 
Alcoholic neuropathy
Cerebral palsy
Leprosy
Syphilis (tabes dorsalis), caused by the organism Treponema pallidum
Spinal cord injury
Myelomeningocele
Syringomyelia
Intra-articular steroid injections
Congenital insensitivity to pain
Peroneal muscular atrophy

Underlying mechanisms
Two primary theories have been advanced:
Neurotrauma: Loss of peripheral sensation and proprioception leads to repetitive microtrauma to the joint in question; this damage goes unnoticed by the neuropathic patient, and the resultant inflammatory resorption of traumatized bone renders that region weak and susceptible to further trauma. In addition, poor fine motor control generates unnatural pressure on certain joints, leading to additional microtrauma.
Neurovascular: Neuropathic patients have dysregulated autonomic nervous system reflexes, and de-sensitized joints receive significantly greater blood flow. The resulting hyperemia leads to increased osteoclastic resorption of bone, and this, in concert with mechanical stress, leads to bony destruction.

In reality, both of these mechanisms probably play a role in the development of a Charcot joint.

Joint involvement
Diabetes is the foremost cause in America today for neuropathic joint disease, and the foot is the most affected region. In those with foot deformity, approximately 60% are in the tarsometatarsal joints (medial joints affected more than lateral), 30% Metatarsophalangeal joints and 10% have ankle disease. Over half of diabetic patients with neuropathic joints can recall some kind of precipitating trauma, usually minor.

Patients with neurosyphilis tend to have knee involvement, and patients with syringomyelia of the spinal cord may demonstrate shoulder deformity.

Hip joint destruction is also seen in neuropathic patients.

Diagnosis

Clinical findings
Clinical findings include erythema, edema and increased temperature in the affected joint. In neuropathic foot joints, plantar ulcers may be present. Note that it is often difficult to differentiate osteomyelitis from a Charcot joint, as they may have similar tagged WBC scan and MRI features (joint destruction, dislocation, edema).  Definitive diagnosis may require bone or synovial biopsy.

Radiologic findings
First, it is important to recognize that two types of abnormality may be detected. One is termed atrophic, in which there is osteolysis of the distal metatarsals in the forefoot. The more common form of destruction is hypertrophic joint disease, characterized by acute peri-articular fracture and joint dislocation. According to Yochum and Rowe, the "6 D's" of hypertrophy are:  
 Distended joint
 Density increase
 Debris production
 Dislocation
 Disorganization
 Destruction

The natural history of the joint destruction process has a classification scheme of its own, offered by Eichenholtz decades ago:

Stage 0: Clinically, there is joint edema, but radiographs are negative. Note that a bone scan may be positive before a radiograph is, making it a sensitive but not very specific modality.

Stage 1: Osseous fragmentation with joint dislocation seen on radiograph ("acute Charcot").

Stage 2: Decreased local edema, with coalescence of fragments and absorption of fine bone debris.

Stage 3: No local edema, with consolidation and remodeling (albeit deformed) of fracture fragments. The foot is now stable.

Atrophic features:
 "Licked candy stick" appearance, commonly seen at the distal aspect of the metatarsals
 Diabetic osteolysis
 Bone resorption

Treatment
Once the process is recognized, it should be treated via the VIPs — vascular management, infection management and prevention, and pressure relief. Aggressively pursuing these three strategies will progress the healing trajectory of the wound. Pressure relief (offloading) and immobilization with total contact casting (TCC) are critical to helping ward off further joint destruction.

TCC involves encasing the patient's complete foot, including toes, and the lower leg in a specialist cast that redistributes weight and pressure in the lower leg and foot during everyday movements. This redistributes pressure from the foot into the leg, which is more able to bear weight, to protect the wound, letting it regenerate tissue and heal. TCC also keeps the ankle from rotating during walking, which prevents shearing and twisting forces that can further damage the wound. TCC aids maintenance of quality of life by helping patients to remain mobile.

There are two scenarios in which the use of TCC is appropriate for managing neuropathic arthropathy (Charcot foot), according to the American Orthopaedic Foot and Ankle Society. First, during the initial treatment, when the breakdown is occurring, and the foot is exhibiting edema and erythema; the patient should not bear weight on the foot, and TCC can be used to control and support the foot. Second, when the foot has become deformed and ulceration has occurred; TCC can be used to stabilize and support the foot, and to help move the wound toward healing.

Walking braces controlled by pneumatics are also used. In these patients, surgical correction of a joint is rarely successful in the long term. However, offloading alone does not translate to optimal outcomes without appropriate management of vascular disease and/or infection. Duration and aggressiveness of offloading (non-weight-bearing vs. weight-bearing, non-removable vs. removable device) should be guided by clinical assessment of healing of neuropathic arthropathy based on edema, erythema, and skin temperature changes. It can take six to nine months for the edema and erythema of the affected joint to recede.

Outcome
Outcomes vary depending on the location of the disease, the degree of damage to the joint, and whether surgical repair was necessary. Average healing times vary from 55 to 97 days, depending on location. Up to one to two years may be required for complete healing.

Further reading
Neuropathic osteoarthropathy by Monica Bhargava, M.D., University of Washington Department of Radiology

References

External links 

Rheumatology
Inflammatory polyarthropathies